Levi Samuel Júlio Faustino (born 31 August 2001) is a Portuguese professional footballer who plays as a defender for Porto B.

International career
Faustino has represented Portugal at youth international level.

Career statistics

Club

Notes

References

2001 births
Living people
People from Aveiro, Portugal
Portuguese footballers
Portugal youth international footballers
Association football defenders
Liga Portugal 2 players
FC Porto players
FC Porto B players
Padroense F.C. players
Sportspeople from Aveiro District